Lo Stato Sociale (Italian for "The Welfare State") are an Italian band, formed in 2009 and consisting of Alberto Cazzola, Lodo Guenzi, Enrico Roberto, Francesco Draicchio and Alberto Guidetti. 

They made their debut in 2010 with the extended play, Welfare Pop, then releasing Amore ai tempi dell'Ikea in 2011. Their debut full-length studio album, Turisti della democrazia, was released by independent record label Garrincha Dischi in 2012. Its follow-up, L'Italia peggiore, became their first charting album, peaking at number 11 on the Italian FIMI Albums Chart in 2014. In 2015, they performed for the first time at the Concerto del Primo Maggio, a televised concert promoted by Italian trade unions to celebrate the International Workers' Day. They performed at the show again in 2017 and 2018.

Their 2017 album, Amore, lavoro e altri miti da sfatare, reached number 6 in Italy. They reached mainstream success in 2018, after placing second in the 68th Sanremo Music Festival with the song "Una vita in vacanza". The performance featured 83-year-old Dancer Paddy Jones, appearing on stage with her partner Nico.
The song topped the Italian Singles Chart and was featured on the band's first compilation album, Primati.

Discography

Studio albums
Turisti della democrazia (2012)
L'Italia peggiore (2014) 
Amore, lavoro e altri miti da sfatare (2017)

Collections
Primati (2018)
Attentato alla musica italiana (2021)

Extended plays
Welfare Pop (2010)
Amore ai tempi dell'Ikea (2011)
Bebo (2021)
Checco (2021)
Carota (2021)
Lodo (2021)
Albi (2021)

References

External links
 

Italian pop music groups
Musical groups established in 2009
Musical groups from Bologna
LGBT-themed musical groups